Rafferty Peak is an 11,110-foot-elevation (3,386 meter) mountain summit located in Yosemite National Park, in California, United States. It is situated on the common border shared by Mariposa and Tuolumne Counties. It is set south of Tuolumne Meadows in the Cathedral Range which is a sub-range of the Sierra Nevada mountain range. Tuolumne Pass is the low point of the saddle between Rafferty Peak and Fletcher Peak.

History
This geographical feature was named in 1895 by Lieutenant Nathaniel Fish McClure who prepared a map of Yosemite National Park for use by troops. The name honors Captain Ogden Rafferty (1860–1922), Medical Corps, United States Army, who accompanied McClure on a patrol of Yosemite Valley. This geographical feature's toponym was submitted by the National Park Service and officially adopted in 1932 by the U.S. Board on Geographic Names. The first ascent of the summit was made by Edward W. Hernden, date unknown.

Climate
According to the Köppen climate classification system, Rafferty Peak is located in an alpine climate zone. Most weather fronts originate in the Pacific Ocean, and travel east toward the Sierra Nevada mountains. As fronts approach, they are forced upward by the peaks (orographic lift), causing them to drop their moisture in the form of rain or snowfall onto the range. Precipitation runoff from this landform drains north to the Tuolumne River via Rafferty Creek, and south to the Merced River.

See also
 
 Geology of the Yosemite area

References

External links
 Weather forecast: Rafferty Peak

Mountains of Yosemite National Park
Mountains of Mariposa County, California
Mountains of Tuolumne County, California
North American 3000 m summits
Mountains of Northern California
Sierra Nevada (United States)